Coleophora tadzhikiella is a moth of the family Coleophoridae. It is found in Tajikistan.

The larvae feed on the leaves of Malus, Pyrus, Crataegus, Amygdalus, Cydonia, Prunus, Persica, Cotoneaster, Sorbus and Rosa species.

References

tadzhikiella
Moths described in 1955
Moths of Asia